Endless Night is a 1972 British horror-mystery film directed by Sidney Gilliat and starring Hayley Mills, Britt Ekland, Per Oscarsson, Hywel Bennett, and George Sanders. Based on the 1967 novel Endless Night by Agatha Christie, the plot follows a newlywed couple who feel threatened after building their dream home on cursed land.

This would be the last project Sidney Gilliat and Frank Launder worked together for British Lion, their home since 1950’s The Happiest Days of Your Life.

Plot
Michael Rogers is a wistful and aimless young aspiring photographer working as a chauffeur and living with his mother in London. Though from a working class background, Michael aspires to a life of luxury and is obsessed with the fine arts. Through his travels as a chauffeur, he discovers a spot along the Devon coast known as Gypsy's Acre, where a dilapidated Victorian mansion sits. Michael fantasizes about one day building a new home on the plot of land and aims to one day have Santonix, a famed Italian architect whom he met through a client, design the home.

While photographing Gypsy's Acre, Michael meets Ellie Thomsen, a young American visiting England, who is quickly taken by Michael's fantastical nature. While exploring the property, the two encounter Miss Townsend, a mysterious old woman who tells Michael that Gypsy's Acre is for sale, but that it is a cursed land. Ellie leaves England and embarks on the remainder of her trip through Switzerland and Italy with Greta, her German language tutor who has taken on the role of a personal assistant. In Ellie's absence, Michael learns that she is in fact one of the richest young women in the world. He confronts her about this when she returns to England, but she explains she did not want to tell him as she thought it would dissuade him from pursuing her. She also reveals that, while visiting Italy, she was able to arrange a meeting with Santonix about building Michael's dream home. Furthermore, she reveals she has purchased Gypsy's Acre.

Though initially angered by her deceit, Michael eventually relents, and he and Ellie marry in Wales. Ellie attempts to keep the marriage secret, as she fears her stepmother, Cora, and other family members may attempt to bribe Michael to divorce her based on his lower social class, but the union quickly makes international headlines. The family's attorney, whom Ellie lovingly refers to as "Uncle" Andrew swiftly attempts to buy Michael off, but he declines, insisting he and Ellie are in love. The couple subsequently purchases a local antique shop to operate.

As construction of the home begins, Greta arrives, announcing she has taken a secretary job in London and begins to slowly infiltrate the couple's new life together. Ellie is welcoming of her presence, but Michael dislikes her. Frank and the other family members approach Greta with similar scepticism, and wish to distance her from Ellie. At the house, Ellie becomes unnerved when she notices Miss Townsend staring at the home from the fields below for hours at a time. While Michael attends an auction in the city, Ellie goes missing while out riding her horse. Her body is subsequently found in the woods on Gypsy's Acre. An autopsy suggests she died of unexpected cardiac arrest, but Michael contests this during the inquest, believing there may be foul play. Police attempt to track Miss Townsend but are unable to locate her. After the inquest, Andrew notifies Michael that Ellie made him the sole beneficiary of her estate, and urges Michael to travel to the United States to tend to Ellie's business dealings there. Santonix, meanwhile, dies after a protracted battle with cancer.

Upon returning to Gypsy's Acre from the United States, Michael witnesses an apparition of Ellie as he approaches the house. Upon entering, he and Greta embrace romantically, and begin to have sex—it is revealed the two lovers had conspired all along, preying on Ellie to take her estate: Greta killed her by lacing her allergy medicine with cyanide and bee venom, which stopped her heart. Michael and Greta's plans of a lavish life together are swiftly interrupted, however, when they receive an envelope postmarked from New York City—sent by Andrew—containing date-stamped photographs of them together long before Michael had met Ellie, serving as evidence of their conspiracy. Michael violently lashes out against Greta, blaming her for the predicament, and murders her in the swimming pool. This triggers a memory from Michael's childhood, in which he killed his schoolmate by pushing him into a frozen pond and stealing his watch as a memento.

Michael is interviewed by police as well as Dr. Philpott, a local psychologist, and admits to helping murder Ellie. Philpott questions him about Miss Townsend, whom he presumes was paid to frighten Ellie, and then killed by Michael afterward to prevent her from exposing the plot; Michael, however, insists Miss Townsend never existed. As they question him further, Michael suffers a nervous breakdown, haunted by images related to those he has killed.

Cast

Production

Development
The novel was published in 1967. Christie later said she normally wrote her books in three to four months but Endless Night was done in six weeks.

Launder and Gilliat had spent two years working on a comedy about British divorce, Sex and the British. However, they had to shelve it when a change in British law meant the plot became obsolete. Instead, they decided to adapt the Agatha Christie novel, with Gilliat to direct and Launder to produce. Their aim was to write a cinematic script with a minimum of dialogue and a deliberate ambiguity of style "in the sense you're never really sure what is being said is what is really meant or really being said." (In the end the film was produced by Gilliat's brother Leslie.)

The film was partly financed from money by the NFFC.

Filming

Filming took place in June 1971. Shooting locations included Christie's Auction House in London, as well as the West Country and Il San Pietro di Positano, Positano, Italy. The Philpotts' estate (Mike and Ellie's neighbours) was filmed at Grim's Dyke.

Gilliat later said, "I felt very rusty getting back on the set and I had a perfectly horrible time- funnily enough back at my very first studio."

Musical score
The score was composed by American composer Bernard Herrmann. Commenting on the experience, Herrmann recounted: "I like to work on a film from the very beginning, but very few producers or directors think of that. They bring you in when the picture is near its final cut and they want you to do it within a very short time—always the least amount of time in which you can possibly do it. Endless Night is an exception...  Sidney Gilliat is a very experienced director who understands the problems, and he asked me to talk with him and consider what we should do musically at a very early stage." Herrmann initially intended to implement a theremin in the score, but instead opted for a Moog synthesizer. Ellie's singing in the film was dubbed by Shirley Jones.

Reception
The film received mixed reviews. Although reasonably faithful to the novel, it is "An example of the sort of thing Christie was writing in her later years: moody psychological studies very different from, and not so much fun as, her early thrillers." Contemporary critics have noted "Nice performances all around, with special admiration for Oscarsson's role as the dying architect." Another review said "It’s not a bad movie, with a decent story and cast, but lacks flair; Gilliat – who has a fine CV – had not directed for ten years and you can tell. " 

Christie was initially pleased with the involvement of Gilliat and the casting of the film. However, upon seeing the film, she "was very disappointed... It got flatter and less interesting every minute." Furthermore, she disliked the (admittedly brief) erotic nudity by Ekland in the film's final sequences.

The initial release in Britain was unsuccessful, and United Artists decided against releasing the film in the United States. However, the film was released in both Denmark and Finland in 1973.

See also
Grim's Dyke

References

Sources

External links
 
 
 

1972 films
1972 horror films
1970s crime thriller films
1970s horror thriller films
1970s mystery films
British crime thriller films
British horror thriller films
British Lion Films films
EMI Films films
Films about curses
Films about inheritances
Films about social class
Films based on British novels
Films based on horror novels
Films based on works by Agatha Christie
Films directed by Sidney Gilliat
Films scored by Bernard Herrmann
Films set in London
Films set in Italy
Films shot at EMI-Elstree Studios
Films shot in Hertfordshire
Films shot in Italy
Films shot in London
Murder in films
1970s English-language films
1970s British films